Novopavlovka is a rural locality (a selo) in Isyangulovsky Selsoviet, Zianchurinsky District, Bashkortostan, Russia. The population was 649 as of 2010. There are 9 streets.

Geography 
Novopavlovka is located 2 km south of Isyangulovo (the district's administrative centre) by road. Isyangulovo is the nearest rural locality.

References 

Rural localities in Zianchurinsky District